Tadeusz Czerwiński (born 30 September 1964) is a Polish sports shooter. He competed at the 1992 Summer Olympics and the 1996 Summer Olympics.

References

1964 births
Living people
Polish male sport shooters
Olympic shooters of Poland
Shooters at the 1992 Summer Olympics
Shooters at the 1996 Summer Olympics
Sportspeople from Warsaw
20th-century Polish people